Lalor railway station is located on the Mernda line in Victoria, Australia. It serves the northern Melbourne suburb of Lalor, and it opened in October 1949 as Rail Motor Stopping Place 77. It was renamed Lalor on 27 August 1952.

History

Lalor station opened in October 1949, and was provided as part of a garden suburb created by the Peter Lalor Home Building Cooperative Society, which was formed by a group of ex-servicemen to provide cheap homes during a time of high demand and shortage of materials post World War II.

The station was originally served by Whittlesea trains from Melbourne via the former Inner Circle line and, in later times, by Thomastown – Whittlesea railmotor shuttles. In November 1959, the section from Thomastown was electrified, with the line beyond Lalor closed. On 29 November 1964, the line was reopened and electrified as far as Epping. In that year, the current island platform was provided, and flashing light signals were provided at the Paschke Crescent level crossing, located at the Up end of the station.

During the 1977/1978 financial year, the present station building was provided. In 1980, boom barriers were provided at the Paschke Crescent level crossing.

The current day Platform 1 was formerly a dock platform. In August 1988, points from No. 1 track to the main line were provided at the Down end of the station, effectively forming a crossing loop between Thomastown and Epping. This arrangement existed until November 2011, when the line between Keon Park and Epping was duplicated, with the points at both ends of the station abolished.

On 4 May 2010, as part of the 2010/2011 State Budget, $83.7 million was allocated to upgrade Lalor to a Premium Station, along with nineteen others. However, in March 2011, this was scrapped by the Baillieu Government.

Announced as part of a $21.9 million package in the 2022/23 Victorian State Budget, Lalor, alongside other stations, will receive accessibility upgrades, the installation of CCTV, and platform shelters. The development process will begin in late 2022 or early 2023, with a timeline for the upgrades to be released once construction has begun.

Lalor station, like the suburb in which it is located, was originally pronounced , as it was named after Peter Lalor and, although some people still pronounce it as such, in recent times, the pronunciation  has become predominant.

Platforms and services

Lalor has one island platform with two faces. It is serviced by Metro Trains' Mernda line services.

Platform 1:
  all stations and limited express services to Flinders Street

Platform 2:
  all stations services to Mernda

Transport links

Dysons operates five routes via Lalor station, under contract to Public Transport Victoria:
 : Thomastown station – Thomastown station (clockwise loop via West Lalor)
 : Pacific Epping – Northland Shopping Centre
 : Thomastown station – Thomastown station (anti-clockwise loop)
 : Thomastown station – Thomastown station (clockwise loop)
 : Lalor – Northland Shopping Centre

Gallery

References

External links
 
 South Morang extension project gallery
 Melway map at street-directory.com.au

Railway stations in Melbourne
Railway stations in Australia opened in 1949
Railway stations in the City of Whittlesea